Pico Rivera is a city located in southeastern Los Angeles County, California. As of the 2020 United States census, the city has a population of 62,088. Pico Rivera is bordered by Montebello to the west, Downey to the south, Santa Fe Springs to the southeast, and Whittier to the east.

History and culture 

Pico Rivera was founded in 1958, from the merger of the long-standing unincorporated communities of Pico (named for Pío Pico, the last Mexican governor of California) and Rivera (the Spanish word for "riverbank"). Situated on a rich alluvial plain between the Rio Hondo and the San Gabriel River, the area was once predominantly agricultural; but, at the end of WWII, the fast rising demand for homes lured builders to the attractive terrain. Since the 1950s, it has been both residential as well as industrial. It had a Ford Motor Company plant for many years: Los Angeles Assembly. Pico Rivera lies below the Whittier Narrows, making it one of the "Gateway Cities".

In January 1958, 56 percent of the electorate voted for incorporation. They approved a Council-Manager form of government, and the name "Pico Rivera" was established for the new city. Five citizens were chosen from a slate of 24 candidates to serve as members of the first City Council; Pico Rivera officially became the 61st city in Los Angeles County.

The north side of the city is home to the Pico Rivera Sports Arena, where concerts and other events are held.

Parks and recreation
There are nine parks and eight playgrounds throughout the city, including Smith Park on Rosemead Boulevard, Rivera Park on Shade Lane, Pico Park on Beverly Boulevard, Rio Vista Park, and Stream Land Park at the north end of Durfee Road. The community enjoys more than 120 acres committed to public recreational facilities. There are 18 athletic fields, two gymnasiums and four community centers, a nine-hole executive golf course, skatepark and aquatic center.

Pico Rivera Municipal Golf Course
In 1965, the Pico Rivera Municipal Golf Course was built for the communal enjoyment of not only its residents and golfers, but also for those in the surrounding communities. The executive nine-hole course plays to a par 29 and measures 1,504 yards. The practice facilities include two putting greens and a covered driving range. Lighting throughout the golf course and driving range enables play and practice until 10:00 p.m.

Senior Center
Pico Rivera's Congressional Representative, Grace Napolitano, helped with the funding, and city officials launched a newly renovated senior center that includes a high-tech computer lab with 16 computers and a modern dance room. Funded by the U.S. Department of Housing and Urban Development and the city's general fund, the US$350,000 renovation of the over 20-year-old center "is an example of your tax dollars at work," Napolitano told a crowd of local officials and residents, who toured the new facility. Napolitano secured a $198,000 federal grant for the project and the city contributed $157,000 in federal stimulus funds. The fitness room has 18 exercise machines, a set of free weights and two 40-inch flat screen TVs. The activity room has a mirrored wall with a ballet barre and a state-of-the-art sound system. The billiard room, which is a popular part of the senior center, was relocated to larger quarters within the center. Since August 24, 2010, it has housed four new pool tables.
The Pico Rivera Center, 9200 Mines Avenue, is open from 8 a.m. to 5 p.m. Monday through Thursday and 8 a.m. to 3 p.m. Friday.

Geography 
Pico Rivera is located at  (33.989013, −118.089121). It is bordered by Downey on the southwest, Santa Fe Springs on the southeast, Whittier on the east, City of Industry on the northeast, Montebello on the northwest, and Commerce on the west. Rosemead/Lakewood Boulevard, CA 19 runs through the center of the city, and the San Gabriel River Freeway (I-605) runs along its southeastern edge.

Pico Rivera was the epicenter of a magnitude 4.4 earthquake on March 16, 2010, which occurred at 4:04 a.m. Pacific Daylight Time (11:04 a.m. Greenwich Mean Time).

Demographics

2010 census
The 2010 United States Census reported that Pico Rivera had a population of 62,942.

The racial makeup of Pico Rivera was 5.2% Non-Hispanic White, 1.0% Black or African American, 1.4% Native American, 2.6% Asian, and 0.1% Pacific Islander. Hispanic or Latino of any race is 91.2% of the population.

The Census reported that 62,488 people (99.3% of the population) lived in households, 39 (0.1%) lived in non-institutionalized group quarters, and 415 (0.7%) were institutionalized.

There were 16,566 households, out of which 8,073 (48.7%) had children under the age of 18 living in them, 8,843 (53.4%) were opposite-sex married couples living together, 3,334 (20.1%) had a female householder with no husband present, 1,470 (8.9%) had a male householder with no wife present. There were 1,041 (6.3%) unmarried opposite-sex partnerships, and 91 (0.5%) same-sex married couples or partnerships. 2,276 households (13.7%) were made up of individuals, and 1,154 (7.0%) had someone living alone who was 65 years of age or older. The average household size was 3.77. There were 13,647 families (82.4% of all households); the average family size was 4.10.

The population was spread out, with 16,792 people (26.7%) under the age of 18, 6,971 people (11.1%) aged 18 to 24, 17,225 people (27.4%) aged 25 to 44, 14,323 people (22.8%) aged 45 to 64, and 7,631 people (12.1%) who were 65 years of age or older. The median age was 34.0 years. For every 100 females, there were 95.5 males. For every 100 females age 18 and over, there were 92.6 males.

The homeowner vacancy rate was 1.0%; the rental vacancy rate was 4.1%. 44,643 people (70.9% of the population) lived in owner-occupied housing units and 17,845 people (28.4%) lived in rental housing units.

2000
As of the census of 2000, there were 63,428 people, 16,468 households, and 13,866 families residing in the city. The population density was 7,645.7 inhabitants per square mile (2,950.6/km). The racial makeup of the city was 49.44% White, 0.71% African American, 1.35% Native American, 2.65% Asian, 0.12% Pacific Islander, 40.28% from other races, and 5.44% from two or more races. Hispanic or Latino of any race were 88.29% of the population.

There were 16,468 households, out of which 43.5% had children under the age of 18 living with them, 58.7% were married couples living together, 17.8% had a female householder with no husband present, and 15.8% were non-families. 12.8% of all households were made up of individuals, and 6.6% had someone living alone who was 65 years of age or older. The average household size was 3.83 and the average family size was 4.12.

The population of the city has 31.0% people under the age of 18, 10.5% from 18 to 24, 29.7% from 25 to 44, 17.8% from 45 to 64, and 11.0% who were 65 years of age or older. The median age was 31 years. For every 100 females, there were 96.4 males. For every 100 females age 18 and over, there were 93.3 males.

The median income for a household in the city was $41,564, and the median income for a family was $45,422. Males had a median income of $29,397 versus $24,491 for females. The per capita income for the city was $13,011. About 11.6% of families and 12.6% of the population were below the poverty line, including 16.0% of those under age 18 and 9.0% of those age 65 or over.

Politics
In the California State Legislature, Pico Rivera is in 30th Senate district represented by Democrat Bob Archuleta, and in 56th Assembly district, represented by Democrat Lisa Calderon.

The Los Angeles County Sheriff's Department (LASD) operates the Pico Rivera Station in Pico Rivera.

The Los Angeles County Department of Health Services operates the Whittier Health Center in Whittier, serving Pico Rivera.

City Council

As of 2023, the city council is composed of Mayor Erik Lutz, Mayor Pro Tem Andrew Lara, Councilmembers Gustavo V. Camacho, Dr. Monica Sanchez, and John Garcia. The city has a council/city manager form of government. The title of Mayor is a ceremonial position that is changed each year within the council.

Business

Historical site
There was a  manufacturing facility located at the corner of Rosemead and Washington boulevards, which was owned and operated by the Ford Motor Company called Los Angeles Assembly. The plant opened in 1958 and closed in 1980 and was purchased by Northrop Grumman in 1982 for its Advanced Systems Division. Upon the unveiling of the B-2 Spirit bomber in 1988, it was revealed that much of the development for the former black project had in fact occurred at the site. In the early 1990s, the division was renamed the B-2 Division to reflect its most famous product. At its peak, the project employed approximately 13,000 workers in Pico Rivera. The site was closed and then demolished in 2001 partially due to air quality remediation efforts, and is now a large retail center.

Redevelopment
There has been significant redevelopment in the city: the opening of the "Pico Rivera Towne Center"", a 60-acre open-air shopping complex along Washington Boulevard, that has brought in such well-known businesses as Starbucks, Petsmart, Lowe's, Walmart, Walgreens, Del Taco and other businesses into the city.

"Pico Crossing" is a 2.79-acre shopping center with retailers that include Rite-Aid Pharmacy, Starbucks, and Subway. Noteworthy redevelopment has taken place in recent years along historic Whittier Boulevard, bringing in such businesses as Target and Panda Express. More developments include the "Pico Rivera Village Walk", a $22 million, 12-acre shopping center located at the southwest corner of Whittier and Paramount boulevards. Tenants: CVS Pharmacy, Cinepolis USA Theaters, are located at the corner of Paramount and Whittier Boulevards. A state-of-the-art LA Fitness, which is part of an 8.10-acre "Pico Rivera Market Place Shopping Center" with a Sexy Nails, Wing Stop, Chase Bank, Juice It Up and other businesses have opened at the corner of Washington and Rosemead Boulevards. The cities taxes were raised from 10.25 percent to 10.75 percent in mid 2009.

Top employers

2019

According to the city's 2019 Comprehensive Annual Financial Report, the top employers in the city are:

2009

According to the city's 2009 Comprehensive Annual Financial Report, the top employers in the city were:

Emergency services 
Fire protection in Pico Rivera is provided by the Los Angeles County Fire Department with ambulance transport by Care Ambulance Service. The Los Angeles County Sheriff's Department provides law enforcement.

Education 
The city is served by the El Rancho and Montebello Unified School Districts (K-12) with nearby university and college systems in Los Angeles and Orange counties providing higher education. Most students attend schools in the El Rancho Unified School District. Those who reside in the Montebello Gardens area are in the Montebello Unified School District.

The Armenian Mesrobian School, a K-12 Armenian private school, is also located in Pico Rivera.

Transportation
One of Pico Rivera's chief attractions to residents and businesses is its central location. It is highly accessible via several freeways, the San Gabriel (605), Santa Ana (5) and the Pomona (60). Public transportation is provided by the Metropolitan Transit Authority (MTA) and Montebello Bus Lines. The MTA website also provides maps of bus and train routes. Information about Montebello Bus Lines schedule is available at City Hall or at hyperlink. Dial-a-Ride service is available to elderly (over 55 years old) and disabled residents.

Pico Rivera's main arterial roads that run from south–north include Rosemead Boulevard, Paramount Boulevard (does not connect to Montebello's Paramount Boulevard), and Passons Boulevard. The main arterial roads that run from west–east include Whittier Boulevard, Slauson Avenue, Washington Boulevard, Beverly Boulevard, and Telegraph Road. Mines Boulevard and San Gabriel River Parkway are other important arterials.

Interstate 605 runs through the northern city limits by the Pico Rivera Sports Arena. Also, two of Pico Rivera's roads are signed off as California State Highways, though Caltrans turned over maintenance of both highways within city limits to the city. The two highways that run in Pico Rivera are California State Route 19 (Rosemead Boulevard) and California State Route 72 (Whittier Boulevard), but only the portion from Interstate 605 to Rosemead Boulevard is signed off as State Route 72, while all of Rosemead Boulevard in Pico Rivera is signed off as State Route 19.

Notable people
 Ron Beilke, former city councilman
 Mack Ray Edwards (1918–1971),  Heavy equipment operator, and child sex abuser and serial killer
 Actress Lupe Ontiveros was "a longtime resident of Pico Rivera".
 Singer Jeanette Jurado, a member of Exposé, is a Pico Rivera native who lived in Pico Rivera until high school.
 Baseball player Randy Flores is an American director of scouting for the St. Louis Cardinals of Major League Baseball (MLB), a sports commentator, entrepreneur, coach, and former professional baseball relief pitcher. Flores attended El Rancho High School and the University of Southern California.
 Soccer player and two-time MLS Cup champion Cristian Roldan is a current player for the Seattle Sounders FC of Major League Soccer. Roldan graduated from El Rancho High School in 2013 and attended the University of Washington.
 Controversial former councilmember Gregory Salcido
James C. Shugg built the first schoolhouse, the Rivera School, in 1868.
Beatrice Proo, former mayor

Sister cities
 San Luis Potosi City, Mexico
 Mazatlan, Mexico
 Tlajomulco de Zúñiga, Mexico

See also 
 List of Mexican-American communities

References

External links

 

 
1958 establishments in California
Cities in Los Angeles County, California
Gateway Cities
Incorporated cities and towns in California
Populated places established in 1958
Chicano and Mexican neighborhoods in California